Mediabase is a music industry service that monitors radio station airplay in 180 US and Canadian markets. Mediabase publishes music charts and data based on the most played songs on terrestrial and satellite radio, and provides in-depth analytical tools for radio and record industry professionals. Mediabase charts and airplay data are used on many popular radio countdown shows and televised music awards programs.  Music charts are published in both domestic and international trade publications and newspapers worldwide.  Mediabase is a division of iHeartMedia.

History 
Mediabase was founded in 1985 by Nancy and Rich Deitemeyer (a.k.a. Rich Meyer).  Originally known as Mediascan, the company changed its name to Mediabase in 1987.  Mediabase became the industry's first mass-airplay monitoring company in late 1987. After its inception, Mediabase was purchased by a private equity group based in Detroit, Michigan, then acquired by California-based Premiere Radio Networks, Jacor Communications, Clear Channel Communications, and ultimately, Bain Capital.

In January 1988, Mediabase began publishing a trade magazine known as Monday Morning Replay, featuring monitored airplay in the top 35 US radio markets. Mediabase then expanded its coverage to 180 US and Canadian markets.  In 1992, Mediabase transitioned to delivery by data disk. In 1997, Mediabase moved its product to the Internet. Over the years, Mediabase has supplied data to numerous trade business-to-business (B-to-B) publications including Radio & Records, Network Magazine Group, Gavin, Hits, and Friday Morning Quarterback. Mediabase charts appear every Friday (originally every Tuesday until during the 3rd quarter of 2015) in USA Today's LIFE section.  Mediabase serves as the official music chart provider for USA Today, the American Music Awards, and numerous syndicated programs, such as American Top 40 with Ryan Seacrest.

Charts and data 
Mediabase produces song charts and airplay analyses of radio airplay in more than two dozen radio formats based on the monitoring of more than 1,800 radio stations in the US and Canada. Mediabase also monitors HD formats, video channels, and satellite radio.

Published charts are used on popular business-to-business (B-to-B) and consumer websites including AllAccess, Friday Morning Quarterback, Country Aircheck, and Hits Daily Double.

Music and entertainment industry executives gain access to in-depth charts and analyses through B-to-B exclusive access.

Mediabase owns and operates Rate the Music, a service that allows consumers to rate music on a scale from 1 to 5 and whether or not they are tired of hearing the song on the radio for the radio and record industries.

As of November 2022, Billboard started using Mediabase to make calculations for the Radio Songs chart, which is one of the components that is used to determine chart positions in the Hot 100 charts in the United States and Canada.

Use in radio programming

Countdown
Mediabase charts are the source for the following radio countdown programs:

 American Top 40 with Ryan Seacrest (Top 40 and Hot AC shows).
 Bob Kingsley's Country Top 40
 Country Countdown USA with Lon Helton
 American Country Countdown with Kix Brooks (from 2009-2017)
 Crook & Chase Country Countdown
 Nikki Sixx Active Rock and Alternative Radio Countdowns
 SiriusXM Hits 1 Weekend Countdown
 Smooth Jazz Top 20 Countdown with Allen Kepler

Other
Mediabase is the primary programming tool for nationally syndicated programs like Open House Party, After Midnite, and Nighttime with Delilah.

Detailed description of data

US Radio

Formats monitored 
 Mainstream adult contemporary
 Hot adult contemporary
 Mainstream top 40
 Rhythmic top 40
 Urban top 40
 Urban adult contemporary
 Country
 Alternative rock
 Active rock
 Mainstream rock
 Adult alternative
 Rhythmic adult contemporary
 Adult hits
 Dance
 Classic rock
 Smooth jazz
 Christian top 40
 Christian adult contemporary
 Classic hits
 Gospel
 Regional Mexican
 Spanish contemporary
 Tropical
 Christmas (seasonal)

Canadian radio 
 Top 40
 Hot Adult Contemporary
 Adult Contemporary
 Country
 Active Rock
 Alternative

References

External links 
 
 USA Today — weekly charts by format
 America's Music Charts — weekly charts 
 AllAccess.com — radio and music industry online community

Audience measurement
Market research companies of the United States
American music websites
American record charts
American companies established in 1985
IHeartMedia
Companies based in San Antonio